Concordia College Alabama was a Private historically black college associated with the Lutheran Church–Missouri Synod and located in Selma, Alabama. It was the only historically black college among the ten colleges and universities in the Concordia University System. The college ceased operations at the completion of the spring 2018 semester, citing years of financial distress and declining enrollment.

History
In 1919, African-American Lutheran congregations in Alabama petitioned the Evangelical Lutheran Synodical Conference of North America for funds to open a high school and college to train church workers. The school opened in 1922 in a rented cottage, and the Synodical Conference soon purchased  in northeast Selma, Alabama, as the site of the Alabama Luther College. A recitation hall (now named Bakke Hall) and a dormitory were erected at a cost of $36,000 and opened in 1925.

The college was forced to close during the Great Depression and the remaining high school was renamed the Alabama Lutheran Academy. Eventually the college was reopened, resulting in the name Alabama Lutheran Academy and College. In 1981, the name was changed to Concordia College Alabama, and in 1994, it gained accreditation from the Southern Association of Colleges and Schools as a bachelor's degree-granting institution.

In February 2018, the college announced that it would close at the conclusion of its academic year due to enduring financial problems. The 147 members of the final graduating class received their diplomas on April 28, 2018.

On January 3, 2019, Dr. Paul J. Kim, a Korean minister, signed paperwork to purchase the campus. He plans to open a "mission retreat center", similar to Yoido Full Gospel Church's Prayer Mountain Korea. He also intends to establish a "contemporary music university" over the next two years.

Campus
Concordia College's Bakke Hall and the Dormitory, completed in 1928, were both added to the Alabama Register of Landmarks and Heritage on June 19, 1997.

Academic profile
The college had 445 students during the fall 2017 term.

Student life

Athletics
At the time of the school's closing, Concordia–Selma athletic teams were called the Hornets. The college was a member of the United States Collegiate Athletic Association (USCAA), primarily competing as an Independent.

Concordia–Selma competed in seven intercollegiate varsity sports: Men's sports included baseball, basketball, and soccer; while women's sports included basketball, softball, track & field, and volleyball.

Football
The college fielded a football team from 2005 until it was cancelled at the end of the 2015 season due to costs.

ROTC
Concordia College Army ROTC, a satellite program of Marion Military Institute, featured more than 25 cadets.

Notable people 
 Fred Rouse - professional football player
 Titus Ryan - National Football League player
 Cortez Stubbs - professional football player
 Rosa Young - professor

See also
 List of historically black colleges and universities

References

Further reading
 Dickinson, Richard C. Roses and Thorns: The Centennial Edition of Black Lutheran Mission and Ministry in the Lutheran Church—Missouri Synod. St. Louis: Concordia Publishing House, 1977.

External links
 Official website 
 Official athletics website 

 
African-American history of Alabama
Buildings and structures in Selma, Alabama
Defunct private universities and colleges in Alabama
Education in Selma, Alabama
Educational institutions established in 1922
Historically black universities and colleges in the United States
Properties on the Alabama Register of Landmarks and Heritage
USCAA member institutions
Universities and colleges accredited by the Southern Association of Colleges and Schools
1922 establishments in Alabama
2018 disestablishments in Alabama
Educational institutions disestablished in 2018
Universities and colleges affiliated with the Lutheran Church–Missouri Synod
Private universities and colleges in Alabama